All or Nothing is the debut studio album by dance pop duo Milli Vanilli, released only outside of North America in November 1988. In 1989, it was repackaged and retitled Girl You Know It's True for release in North America on the Arista label, with several of the original album tracks replaced and/or remixed. All or Nothing was a moderate success, reaching the top 40 in several European countries and #1 in New Zealand. It originally reached #37 in the UK, but was packaged together with The U.S.-Remix Album: All or Nothing in 1989 under the name 2×2 and reached #6. After 1990, due to lip-synching allegations, a disclaimer sticker was added on the cover to explicitly name the singers who provided vocals on the album.

Although All or Nothing was replaced in America with Girl You Know It's True, All or Nothing is available on the American iTunes Store.

In December 1990, singer-songwriter David Clayton-Thomas sued Milli Vanilli for copyright infringement, alleging that the title track used the melody from his 1968 composition "Spinning Wheel", a hit for his group Blood, Sweat & Tears.

All or Nothing was included in Q magazine's 2006 list of the 50 worst albums ever made.

Track listing

Personnel
Milli Vanilli
 Rob Pilatus – visual performance
 Fab Morvan – visual performance

Session musicians
 Charles Shaw – lead vocals, backing vocals
 John Davis – lead vocals
 Brad Howell – lead vocals
 Jens Gad – guitars, arrangements
 Peter Weihe – guitars
 P.G. Wilder – keyboards, arrangements
 Toby Gad – keyboards, arrangements
 Pit Loew – keyboards, arrangements
 Volker Barber – keyboards
 Curt Cress – drums
 Mel Collins – saxophone
 Dino Solera – horns, horn arrangements
 Felice Civitareale – horns
 Franz Weyerer – horns
 Jodie and Linda Rocco – backing vocals
 Felicia Taylor – backing vocals
 The Jackson Singers – backing vocals
 Herbert Gebhard – backing vocals
 Bimey Oberreit – backing vocals
 Peter Rishavy – backing vocals

Production
 Frank Farian – producer
 Ingrid Segieth – production coordinator
 Tobias Freund – engineering
 Bernd Berwanger – engineering
 Norbert Janicke – engineering
 Jens Seekamp – engineering

Charts

Weekly charts

Year-end charts

Certifications

References

Milli Vanilli albums
1988 debut albums
Albums produced by Frank Farian
Hansa Records albums